Bacchisa sumatrensis is a species of beetle in the family Cerambycidae. It was described by Breuning in 1950. It is known from Sumatra.

References

S
Beetles described in 1950